Go Young-jun (Hangul: 고영준, born December 28, 1978), better known by the mononym Youngjun (Hangul: 영준), is a South Korean singer and member of Brown Eyed Soul, signed under in Next Music. He released his debut solo album, Easy, on January 20, 2012.

Discography

Studio albums

Extended plays

Singles

Soundtrack appearances

References

1978 births
Living people
South Korean rhythm and blues singers
South Korean pop singers
21st-century South Korean male  singers